Leonardo Alenza y Nieto (6 November 1807, Madrid – 30 June 1845, Madrid) was a Spanish painter and engraver in the Romantic style; associated with the Costumbrista movement.

Biography 
His mother died around 1813, when he was only six or seven.

In 1817, his father remarried. His step-mother was only eleven years older than he was. Soon after, the family moved from the busy neighborhood where they lived, to a quieter street near a Jesuit convent. He probably began his higher education there, at the Colegio Imperial de la Compañía de Jesús.

In 1819, at age 16, he was enrolled at the Academia de San Fernando, where he initially studied with the painters Zacarías González Velázquez, Juan Antonio Ribera and José Aparicio, as well as the engraver Vicente Peleguer (1793-1865) and the sculptor Esteban de Agreda (1759–1842). He finished his studies there with José Madrazo.

He remained attached to the Academy until 1833, when he received a commission from the Ayuntamiento of Madrid to paint an allegorical picture of Isabella becoming Queen at the age of three. The following year, he created a cenotaph honoring the late King Fernando VII, composed of five panels done in grisaille.

Two years later, he collaborated with the Semanario to produce illustrations for a new edition of the novel Gil Blas and the complete works of Francisco de Quevedo. He also created decorations for the popular .

In 1842, the Academy awarded him the title of "Académico de Mérito" for his painting of David cutting off the head of Goliath. This would be his last major work, as he had been suffering from tuberculosis for several years and was in very poor health. Despite this, he managed to serve as a professor for a few months.

Meanwhile, he was living in a cow barn, because he had become convinced that the fumes there were beneficial. Nothing helped, however, and he died in 1845 at the age of 38. He had become impoverished by then and his friends had to intervene to prevent his burial in a common grave.

Other selected paintings

References

Further reading 
 Francisco Pompey, "Leonardo Alenza", in Temas españoles #249, Publicaciones Españolas, 1956
 Leonardo Alenza (1807-1845): Dibujos y Estampas, Secretaria General Técnica, Centro de Publicaciones, 1997

External links 

 Digitalized works by Alenza in the "Biblioteca Digital Hispánica" of the Biblioteca Nacional de España.
 ArtNet: More works by Alenza
 Sonnet composed on the occasion of Alenza's death by Juan Eugenio Hartzenbusch.
 Critique of the Satire on Romantic Suicide from Rebels and Martyrs: The Image of the Artist in the Nineteenth Century by Alexander Sturgis
 Scholarly articles about Leonardo Alenza both in web and PDF @ the Spanish Old Masters Gallery

1807 births
1845 deaths
Artists from Madrid
19th-century engravers
Spanish engravers
19th-century Spanish painters
19th-century Spanish male artists
Spanish male painters
Painters from the Community of Madrid